The Lady of the Lake (Polish original title: Pani Jeziora) is the fifth and final novel in the Witcher Saga written by Polish fantasy writer Andrzej Sapkowski, first published in Poland in 1999. It is a sequel to the fourth Witcher novel, The Tower of Swallows.

Plot
Sir Galahad, King Arthur's knight, stumbles upon Ciri bathing. Ciri recounts her story to him, warning that it does not have a happy ending. Parallel to this, years after the main story, the sorceress Condwiramurs, is apprenticed to Nimue, the Lady of the Lake, to study the legend of Geralt and Ciri. Condwiramurs's has clairvoyant dreams, stimulated by studying paintings and other images of the story.

In the present, Stefan Skellen, the coroner of Nilfgaard, is working with the sorcerer Vilgefortz, who has imprisoned the sorceress Yennefer. Geralt and his company - Dandelion, Regis, Milva, Angoulême, and Cahir - relax in the duchy of Toussaint. Geralt is distracted by monster-hunting and an affair with the Duchess's court sorceress, Fringilla Vigo, a member of the Lodge of Sorceresses. Geralt's latest contract has him eavesdrop a meeting between Skellen and rebellious nobles, plotting the Emperor's overthrow. Geralt overhears Vilgefortz's location from Skellen, and he and his party leave Toussaint, except Dandelion, who stays with his lover, Duchess Anna Henrietta.

After the events of the previous novel, Ciri was teleported to a foreign world ruled by the Aen Elle elves, under occasional attacks by unicorns, where time flows differently. A magical barrier prevents her from leaving, and she is told by the sage Avallac'h that to leave, she must bear the child of their king, Auberon. Avallac'h explains that Ciri possesses a gene engineered to make her child the most powerful magic-user in history, to save the world from an impending cataclysm. Ciri reluctantly agrees, but Auberon fails to perform several times. Avallac'h assures her that once she bears the child, she will be returned to her time. However, Eredin Breacc Glas, the commander of a cavalry unit, tells Ciri that she will never escape.

Eventually, Ciri tries to escape on her horse, Kelpie, but the barrier stops her. She is confronted by unicorns, among them Ihuarraquax, who she had saved (in The Time of Contempt). The unicorns reveal she can bypass the barrier by boat. Before leaving, she finds Auberron dying after drinking an aphrodisiac given to him by Eredin. Ciri stays with Auberon until he dies, then steals a boat. She is confronted by Eredin, and a fight ensues. She escapes to join Ihuarraquax and other unicorns waiting for her. Eredin and his riders chase her, and a battle between them and the unicorns ensues. Ihuarraquax seemingly sacrifices himself to help Ciri escape. After jumping between several worlds and times, she meets Nimue and Condwiramurs, who provide a portal to the right time.

Meanwhile, the decisive battle of Brenna between the allied Northern Kingdoms and the invading army of Nilfgaard is narrated from various points of view, primarily by Jarre, a scribe from Melitele's temple, and "Rusty", a halfling field surgeon. The Nilfgaardians are eventually routed by Redanian forces. Nilfgaard is forced back across its original border, and sues for peace. Rusty dies months later, treating the victims of a plague outbreak, while Jarre writes his memoirs in his old age.

Ciri arrives at Vilgefortz's castle, offering to trade herself for Yennefer, but Vilgefortz imprisons her. As he plans to inseminate her to produce the prophesied magic user, Geralt and his group storm the castle. In the ensuing battle, Yennefer is freed, but Geralt's companions Milva and Angoulême are killed, and Cahir is killed by Bonhart, who is himself killed by Ciri. When Geralt, Yennefer, and Regis confront Vilgefortz, Regis is killed, but Geralt kills Vilgefortz, with help from an amulet gifted by Fringilla. Geralt and Yennefer, the only survivors, find Ciri.

Leaving, they find a Nilfgaardian force, led by Emperor Emhyr. Skellen is arrested for treason. Emhyr is revealed to be Ciri's father, who courted her mother, Pavetta, under the name Duny (in "A Question of Price"), having faked his death years ago. To produce Ciri's prophesied child and save the world, Emhyr plans to impregnate her, and make her empress. Emhyr plans to execute Geralt and Yennefer, to keep them silent, and grants them the option of committing suicide together. As they prepare to do so, Ciri interrupts them, as Emhyr and his men had left. Ciri had broken down in tears at the thought of losing Geralt and Yennefer, moving Emhyr to change his mind.

Ciri, along with Geralt and Yennefer, punishes those who hurt her along her adventures. She and Yennefer are summoned by the Lodge, and Yennefer goes ahead, while Ciri and Geralt go to Toussaint. They find Dandelion about to be executed, then spared, by Anna Henrietta. The trio departs Toussaint, and Ciri departs to meet the Lodge while Geralt and Dandelion head to Rivia. The Lodge claim that since Emhyr has married the "false Ciri", Ciri is unable to claim the Cintran throne; they plan for Ciri to become the mistress of Prince Tankred, the Kovirian heir, to bear the prophesied child. Ciri asks to leave with Yennefer, meet Geralt in Rivia, and return to the Lodge afterwards. The Lodge votes on this, with Phillipa Eilhart having the decisive vote in favor of letting Ciri go, arguing it's Ciri's destiny.

While Geralt is in Rivia meeting his friends Yarpen Zigren and Zoltan Chivay, a riot and pogrom erupts with humans killing non-humans. Geralt fights to save his dwarven friends, but is impaled on a pitchfork. Ciri, Yennefer, and Triss Merigold arrive shortly after, and find Geralt on the verge of death. Yennefer and Triss conjure a storm, dispersing the rioters. Yennefer attempts to heal Geralt but loses consciousness. An alive Ihuarraquax appears out of a foggy lake and channels his power through Ciri to heal Geralt. Guided by him, Ciri and her friends put Geralt and Yennefer's bodies on a boat that appears out of fog. The three disappear into the fog. Geralt and Yennefer awake in an unknown location (hinted to be Avalon), comforting each other.

Ciri finishes recounting her tale to Galahad. When Galahad asks if that is the end, Ciri says that she doesn't want the story to end like that. She claims the tale ends with Yennefer and Geralt getting married and living happily ever after, but cries as she says so. Galahad invites her to Camelot, which she accepts. The two ride towards Camelot, holding hands.

Translations
It was published in Czech (Leonardo, 2000), Russian (AST, 2000), Spanish (Bibliopolis, 2006), Lithuanian (Eridanas, 2007), French (Bragelonne, 2011), German (DTV, 2011), Italian (Editrice_Nord, 2015), Finnish (WSOY, 2016) and Dutch (Luitingh-Sijthoff 2016). The English translation was released by Victor Gollancz on March 14, 2017 (Orbit/US) and March 16, 2017 (Orion/UK).

Reception

References

1999 novels
Polish novels
The Witcher
Polish fantasy novels